Doriprismatica is a genus of sea slugs, dorid nudibranchs, shell-less marine gastropod mollusks in the family Chromodorididae.

Species 
Species in the genus Doriprismatica include:

Species brought into synonymy
 Doriprismatica festiva A. Adams, 1861: synonym of Hypselodoris festiva (A. Adams, 1861)
 Doriprismatica imperialis (Pease, 1860): synonym of Hypselodoris imperialis (Pease, 1860)

References

Chromodorididae
Gastropod genera
Taxa named by Alcide d'Orbigny